The AEG D.I was a biplane fighter of World War I. Three prototypes were ordered, but after the first two were involved in serious crashes, one of which killed flying ace Walter Höhndorf on September 5, 1917, development was cancelled. A triplane version was built as the Dr.I. The second and third prototypes differed little from the first except in detail.

Variants 
A.E.G. D.I1917 prototype single seat biplane fighter.
A.E.G. Dr.I1917 prototype single seat triplane fighter.

Aircraft numbers 
 AEG D.I first prototype – D4400/17.
 AEG D.I second prototype – D4401/17.
 AEG D.I third prototype – D5002/17
 AEG Dr.I prototype – no. not known

Specifications (AEG D.I)

See also

References

Further reading

 Kroschel, Günter; Stützer, Helmut: Die deutschen Militärflugzeuge 1910–18, Wilhelmshaven 1977
 Munson, Kenneth: Bomber 1914–19, Zürich 1968, Nr. 20
 Nowarra, Heinz: Die Entwicklung der Flugzeuge 1914–18, München 1959
 Sharpe, Michael: Doppeldecker, Dreifachdecker & Wasserflugzeuge, Gondrom, Bindlach 2001, 
 Wagner, Ray and Nowarra, Heinz. German Combat Planes: A Comprehensive Survey and History of the Development of German Military Aircraft from 1914 to 1945. New York: Doubleday, 1971.

D.I
1910s German fighter aircraft
Aircraft first flown in 1917